Tara Brach (born May 17, 1953) is an American psychologist, author, and proponent of Buddhist meditation. She is a guiding teacher and founder of the Insight Meditation Community of Washington, D.C. (IMCW). Her colleagues in the Vipassanā, or insight meditation tradition, include Jack Kornfield, Sharon Salzberg, and Joseph Goldstein. Brach also teaches about Buddhist meditation at centers for meditation and yoga in the United States and Europe, including Spirit Rock Meditation Center in Woodacre, California; the Kripalu Center; and the Omega Institute for Holistic Studies.

Brach is an Engaged Buddhist, specializing in the application of Buddhist teachings and mindfulness meditation to emotional healing. She has authored several books on these subjects, including Radical Acceptance, True Refuge, and Radical Compassion.

Education
Brach holds bachelor's degrees in psychology and political science from Clark University. She was awarded a doctorate in clinical psychology from the Fielding Graduate University based on her dissertation analyzing the effectiveness of meditation in the healing of eating disorders.

Personal life
Brach resides in Virginia with her husband, Jonathan Foust, a yoga and meditation teacher. She was raised Christian Unitarian.

Bibliography

Books and published works
 
 Brach, Tara (2012). "Mindful Presence: A Foundation for Compassion and Wisdom", in Wisdom and Compassion in Psychotherapy: Deepening Mindfulness in Clinical Practice edited by Christopher K. Germer and Ronald D. Siegel. Guilford Press 
 
 Brach, Tara (2014). "Healing Traumatic Fear: The Wings of Mindfulness and Love", in Mindfulness-Oriented Interventions for Trauma: Integrating Contemplative Practices edited by Follette, Briere, Rozelle, Hopper and Rome. Guilford Press 
 
 

Audio publications
 Radical Self-Acceptance: A Buddhist Guide to Freeing Yourself from Shame (2005) 
 Radical Acceptance: Guided Meditations (2007) 
 Meditations for Emotional Healing (2009) 
 Meditation and Psychotherapy: A Professional Training Course for Integrating Mindfulness into Clinical Practice (2011) 
 Mindfulness Meditations: Nine Guided Practices to Awaken Presence and Open Your Heart (2012) 
 Finding True Refuge: Meditations for Difficult Times'' (2013)

References

External links
 
 Tara Brach's Insight Meditation Community of Washington Biography
 Downloadable talks and meditations at IMCW
 Downloadable talks and meditations at Dharmaseed

Interviews
 Tara Brach on Mindfulness, Psychotherapy and Awakening Psychotherapy.net, by Deb Kory, 2012.
 When Ego Meets Non-Ego Shambhala Sun, by Andrea Miller, March 2013.
 A Blend of Buddhism and psychology American Psychological Association, Psychologist Profile by Tori Angelis, February 2014.
 The Awakened Heart: A Conversation with Tara Brach Psychology Today with Mark Matousek May 15, 2014.
 Wake Up from Unworthiness – An Interview with Tara Brach Spirituality & Health – September–October 2015. (Paywall)
 Releasing the Barriers to Love: An Interview with Tara Brach Psychology Today with Mark Matousek November 2015.

Articles
 Brach, Tara. "Feeling Overwhelmed? Remember RAIN" Mindful Magazine, June 13, 2014.
 Brach, Tara. "Facing My White Privilege" Lion's Roar Magazine, June 22, 2016.

American women psychologists
21st-century American psychologists
American Buddhists
Engaged Buddhists
Buddhist writers
American anti-war activists
American spiritual writers
Theravada Buddhist spiritual teachers
Living people
Female Buddhist spiritual teachers
1953 births
Clark University alumni
21st-century American women
20th-century American psychologists